Qaleh-ye Safa (also Romanized as Qal‘eh-ye Şafā; also known as Şafā) is a village in Hesar Rural District, Khabushan District, Faruj County, North Khorasan Province, Iran. At the 2006 census, its population was 420, in 112 families.

References 

Populated places in Faruj County